John Alfred Newman (born 12 November 1884 – 21 December 1973) was an English first-class cricketer who played for Hampshire. He was an all-rounder, a right-handed batsman and right-arm bowler, able to bowl fast-medium outswing with the new ball and then brisk offspin.

In a long first-class career that lasted from 1906 to 1930, he took 2054 wickets at an average of 25.02, with best innings figures of 9/131. Newman took ten or more wickets in a match on 35 occasions. In 1927 he took 16 wickets for 88 runs against Somerset. Only two players taking more wickets in a career were never capped by England. For a number of years he and Alec Kennedy carried the Hampshire attack with little support, on two occasions bowling unchanged through both innings of a match.

He scored 15,364 runs at 21.57, with ten centuries of which the highest was 166 not out. He also held 318 catches.

He completed the 'double' of 1000 runs and 100 wickets in a season five times between 1921 and 1928. In 1921 he was the first that season to do so. His best all-round performance in a match was in 1926 against Gloucestershire; he scored 66 and 42 not out and took 14 wickets for 148 runs.

John Arlott included him in a side of the best players who were never selected by England to play in a Test match.

In 1922 Newman was involved in an incident at Trent Bridge, refusing to bowl while the crowd were barracking. His captain, the Hon. L. H. Tennyson ordered him from the field.

At the close of play Tennyson summoned Newman into the amateurs' changing-room. "Jack," he said, "you have this afternoon disgraced the annals of Hampshire cricket ... Hampshire cricket, mind you, the cradle of the game. You must send a letter of apology. Sit down; here's pen and paper. I'll dictate the letter."

Tennyson proceeded to speak out loud a letter to the president of Nottinghamshire in which Newman, who copied his captain's words down without a murmur, offered his profound apologies. A second letter, to Carr, the Nottinghamshire captain, followed.

Tennyson was not quite finished. "Now, Jack, a final letter. To the Hon. L H Tennyson, captain, Hampshire County CC, Trent Bridge, Nottinghamshire. `Dear Skipper, I humbly regret my behaviour, and so on,' you confounded old villain; and don't let us have a repetition of your disgraceful conduct. And, good evening to you, Jack, and, damn you, take this." He thrust a five-pound note – a considerable sum in those days – into Newman's hands.

He stood as a first-class umpire for nine seasons. Subsequently, he emigrated to Cape Town, where he coached for a number of years.

Notes

References 

1884 births
1973 deaths
English cricketers
Hampshire cricketers
English cricket umpires
People from Southsea
Players cricketers
Marylebone Cricket Club cricketers
Non-international England cricketers
English cricketers of 1919 to 1945
C. I. Thornton's XI cricketers
North v South cricketers
Canterbury cricketers